On and On is the second studio album by Jack Johnson, who provided the vocals and guitars. It was released in 2003 on Universal Records. Adam Topol played drums and percussion while Merlo Podlewski played bass guitar. The album was recorded at The Mango Tree studios in Hawaii.

A different version of the track "Rodeo Clowns" was originally published as a collaboration with G. Love & Special Sauce on the latter's 1999 album Philadelphonic.

Johnson sang the chorus of his song "Gone" on the Black Eyed Peas' song "Gone Going", which appeared on their album Monkey Business. The song was nominated at the 2006 Grammy Awards for Best Pop Collaboration with Vocals.

Track listing
All songs written by Jack Johnson, except where noted.

"Times Like These" – 2:22
"The Horizon Has Been Defeated" – 2:33
"Traffic in the Sky" – 2:50
"Taylor" – 3:59
"Gone" – 2:10
"Cupid" – 1:05
"Wasting Time" (Johnson, Adam Topol, Merlo Podlewski) – 3:50
"Holes to Heaven" – 2:54
"Dreams Be Dreams" – 2:12
"Tomorrow Morning" – 2:50
"Fall Line" – 1:35
"Cookie Jar" – 2:57
"Rodeo Clowns" – 2:38
"Cocoon" – 4:10
"Mediocre Bad Guys" – 3:00
"Symbol in My Driveway" – 2:55

Personnel
Credits adapted from the album's liner notes.

Musicians
 Jack Johnson – vocals, guitar
 Adam Topol – drums, percussion
 Merlo Podlewski – bass guitar

Production
 Mario Caldato Jr. – producer, engineer, mixing
 Robert Carranza – engineer, mixing
 Bernie Grundman – mastering

Charts

Weekly charts

Year-end charts

Decade-end chart

Certifications

References

Jack Johnson (musician) albums
2003 albums
Universal Music Group albums
Albums produced by Mario Caldato Jr.